, provisional designation  is a trans-Neptunian object and possible centaur located in the outermost region of the Solar System. With an absolute magnitude of 5.7, it approximately measures  in diameter. It was discovered on 4 August 2010 by the Pan-STARRS-1 survey at the Haleakala Observatory, Hawaii, in the United States. According to American astronomer Michael Brown, it is "possibly" a dwarf planet.

Orbit and classification 

 orbits the Sun at a distance of 21.1–56.6 AU once every 241 years and 11 months (88,365 days; semi-major axis of 38.83 AU). Its orbit has an eccentricity of 0.46 and an inclination of 22° with respect to the ecliptic. The body's observation arc begins with a precovery at Palomar Observatory in October 2004, or almost six years prior to its official discovery observation by Pan-STARRS.

Numbering and naming 

This minor planet was numbered by the Minor Planet Center on 25 September 2018. As of 2018, it has not been named.

Physical characteristics

Diameter and albedo 

According to the Johnston's archive and to Michael Brown,  measures 321 and 329 kilometers in diameter, based on an absolute magnitude of 5.7 and 5.8 and an assumed standard albedo of 0.09 and 0.08 for the body's surface, respectively. As of 2018, no physical characteristics have been determined from photometric observations. The body's rotation period, pole and shape remain unknown.

References

External links 
 Discovery Circumstances: Numbered Minor Planets (520001)-(525000) – Minor Planet Center
 
 

523643
523643
523643
523643
20100804